Dagazvirus is a genus of viruses in the realm Ribozyviria, containing the single species Dagazvirus schedorhinotermitis. It is the only species within its realm known to be hosted by an invertebrate animal; the termite Schedorhinotermes intermedius.

References 

Virus genera